Ivaylo Bogdanov Petev (born 9 July 1975) is a Bulgarian professional football manager and former player. He played as a midfielder.

Petev spent his whole career playing in Bulgaria, a part from a season at Greek club Trikala. He was most successful early in his career with hometown club Litex Lovech.

After finishing his playing career, Petev became a manager, managing and having the most success at Bulgarian club Ludogorets Razgrad. He also worked as a manager in Cyprus, Croatia, Saudi Arabia and Poland. Petev worked as head coach of the Bulgaria and Bosnia and Herzegovina national team as well.

Playing career
Petev previously played as a midfielder for Litex Lovech, Spartak Varna, Rodopa Smolyan and Marek Dupnitsa.

Managerial career

Ludogorets Razgrad
After a short spell at Lyubimets as a player-manager in 2009, Petev was appointed as manager of Ludogorets Razgrad, following Kiril Domuschiev's purchase of the club. He managed to lead the team to a promotion to the top division of Bulgarian football, followed by two A Group titles (the first in the club's history), a Bulgarian Cup and a Bulgarian Supercup. On 21 July 2013, Ludogorets replaced Petev with Stoycho Stoev after poor performances against Lyubimets and Slovan Bratislava in the first leg of the UEFA Champions League qualifying rounds.

Levski Sofia
On 8 October 2013, Petev became manager of Levski Sofia, which proved unpopular because of his past club allegiances. At his public unveiling, gathered Levski supporters stripped off his shirt in front of the press, which led to Petev's resignation a day later.

AEL Limassol
In October 2013, Petev signed a contract with Cypriot side AEL Limassol. He led AEL to the first place in the regular season's league table, three points ahead of Apollon Limassol and APOEL Nicosia, which resulted in the qualification for the play-offs. Although leading the group until the last round, AEL lost the title in the decisive match against APOEL. Despite the defeat, AEL qualified for the 2014–15 UEFA Champions League season. Petev led the team to a 1–0 win against Zenit Saint Petersburg in the first leg of the UEFA Champions League third qualifying round, but his team failed to keep the advantage and lost the second leg 0–3, thus being eliminated and placed in the UEFA Europa League. AEL were drawn against English team, Tottenham Hotspur, but were eliminated after losing 5–1 on aggregate.

Bulgaria
In December 2014, Petev was officially appointed by the Bulgarian Football Union as head coach of the Bulgaria national team. In his first official game in charge, Bulgaria played a 2–2 draw at home against Italy despite leading until the 84th minute thanks to first half goals from Ivelin Popov and Iliyan Mitsanski. The team eventually finished in fourth place and was unable to qualify for UEFA Euro 2016.

Dinamo Zagreb
On 27 September 2016, Petev became manager of Croatian team Dinamo Zagreb.

He was sacked on 13 July 2017, after Dinamo finished the season trophyless for the first time in twelve years, and after he fell out with several players including Ante Ćorić, Sammir and Junior Fernandes.

Later career
After Dinamo, Petev worked as a manager at Cypriot club Omonia, Saudi Arabian side Al Qadsiah and Polish club Jagiellonia Białystok.

Bosnia and Herzegovina
On 21 January 2021, it was announced that the Bosnia and Herzegovina FA had named Petev as the new Bosnia and Herzegovina national team head coach, ahead of the country's 2022 FIFA World Cup qualifiers.

He debuted as head coach on 24 March 2021, in a World Cup qualifier game against Finland, which ended as a 2–2 draw. By the end of the qualifying campaign, Bosnia and Herzegovina won only seven points, making it the worst qualifying campaign in their history. On 23 September 2022, Bosnia and Herzegovina topped their group in the UEFA Nations League, and got promoted to League A.

Despite promoting the team to the UEFA Nations League A, Petev's contract expired and he was released from his duties as head coach in December 2022, before the start of Bosnia and Herzegovina's UEFA Euro 2024 qualifying campaign.

Return to Ludogorets
In March 2023, Petev once again took over as manager of Ludogorets Razgrad, succeeding Ante Šimundža.

Personal life
In December 2014, Petev appeared on Slavi's Show. He is married and has a daughter.

Managerial statistics

Honours

Player
Litex Lovech
Bulgarian B Group: 1996–97
Bulgarian Cup: 2000–01

Manager
Ludogorets Razgrad
Bulgarian A Group: 2011–12, 2012–13
Bulgarian B Group: 2010–11 (East)
Bulgarian Cup: 2011–12
Bulgarian Supercup: 2012

References

External links

1975 births
Living people
People from Lovech
Bulgarian footballers
Association football midfielders
Bulgarian football managers
Bulgarian expatriate football managers
First Professional Football League (Bulgaria) players
PFC Litex Lovech players
PFC Spartak Varna players
PFC Cherno More Varna players
PFC Rodopa Smolyan players
FC Dunav Ruse players
PFC Marek Dupnitsa players
FC Lyubimets players
FC Etar 1924 Veliko Tarnovo players
Croatian Football League managers
Saudi Professional League managers
PFC Ludogorets Razgrad managers
PFC Levski Sofia managers
AEL Limassol managers
Bulgaria national football team managers
GNK Dinamo Zagreb managers
AC Omonia managers
Al-Qadisiyah FC managers
Jagiellonia Białystok managers
Bosnia and Herzegovina national football team managers
Expatriate football managers in Cyprus
Expatriate football managers in Croatia
Expatriate football managers in Saudi Arabia
Expatriate football managers in Poland
Expatriate football managers in Bosnia and Herzegovina